Hampden Park is a football stadium in Glasgow.

It may also refer to:
Hampden Park (1873–83), the original Hampden Park stadium in Glasgow
Cathkin Park, the second Hampden Park stadium in Glasgow, later renamed
Hampden Park, Eastbourne, a suburb of Eastbourne
home to Hampden Park railway station
Pynchon Park, a sports venue in Springfield, Massachusetts, also known as Hampden Park
Veterans Park (Holyoke, Massachusetts), a park in Holyoke originally known as Hampden Park